The Merchantville Formation is a geological formation in the northeastern United States whose strata date back to the Late Cretaceous, around the time of the Santonian and Campanian age. Dinosaur remains are among the fossils that have been recovered from the formation.

Vertebrate fauna
 Tyrannosauroidea (Dryptosauridae) indet. (="Cryptotyrannus")
 Hadrosauridae indet. (="Atlantohadros")
 Hadrosaurus foulkii
 Bothremys cooki
 Mosasaurus sp.
 Ornithomimidae indet.

See also

 List of dinosaur-bearing rock formations

References

Cretaceous Maryland
Cretaceous Delaware
Cretaceous geology of New Jersey